The 1970 Blue Swords was an international figure skating competition organized in East Germany. Medals were awarded in the disciplines of men's singles, ladies' singles and pair skating. It was the tenth edition of the annual event and included skaters from ten countries. East Germany won all three categories, with Jan Hoffmann taking the men's title, Sonja Morgenstern winning the ladies' event, and Manuela Groß / Uwe Kagelmann becoming the pair champions.

Men

Ladies

Pairs

References 

Blue Swords
Blue Swords
1970 in East German sport